Pseudo-listening is a type of non-listening that consists of appearing attentive in conversation while actually ignoring or only partially listening to the other speaker. The intent of pseudo-listening is not to listen, but to cater to some other personal need of the listener. The word pseudo-listening is a compound word composed of the individual words pseudo (a Greek root meaning "not real or genuine"), and listening. An example of pseudo-listening is trying to multitask by talking on the phone while watching television or completing work. Pseudo-listening is the most ineffective way to communicate because after the conversation one will not have retained much of the information that was said.

Possible reasons 

 Listening for ways someone can reject you.  
 Forming your response to the speaker instead of focusing on what is being said.  
 Preoccupation, when there is too much on the mind of the listener, so that they cannot listen. 
 Preexisting familiarity with the topic of conversation, which results in less effort to actively listen. 
 Only listening for information you want to hear, giving little attention to the rest. 
 Listening only for the flaws in their argument in order to gain an advantage over the speaker. 
 Social pressure to be courteous to those speaking. 
 Hope that they will believe you are listening and return the favor. 
 An effort to build others' views of you. 
 Desire not to hurt someone who is sharing experiences.

In comparison to active listening 

Individuals who are pseudo-listening may include minimal encouragers to compensate for their non-listening, such as nodding their heads, looking at the speaker, smiling at the appropriate times, and displaying other aspects of paying attention, so it may be difficult at times to distinguish between active listening and pseudo-listening. Similarly, broad answers or responses that are not relevant to the topic at hand also give away a pseudo-listener. These responses are known as tangential responses and often run alongside the topic being discussed, but ultimately have nothing to do with the main topic of the discussion.

Proper listening is needed to internalize and comprehend material; without this developed skill, there is potential for either pseudo-listening or a total lack of listening. A person who is truly listening may display certain body language such as maintaining eye contact or positioning their body towards the speaker. Real listening is done with the intent to understand a person's perspective, enjoy a person's company, learn new information, or provide assistance or comfort, among other things.

How it affects communication 

Pseudo-listening is most common in face-to-face communication, but it can also be expressed through phone calls, text messages and e-mails.  Effective communication is dependent upon both the receiver and the sender to be fully aware of what is being said and heard. When one person projects their thoughts, and the receiver of the message is only pretending to listen, poor communication and possibly misunderstanding often occur. Babies spend their first few years listening to people around them in order to learn language. According to Edwing Llangari people spend around half their lives listening to others. An article from University of Colorado states that poor listening skills make good communication pretty much impossible to achieve. It says that, "no matter how much care one person or group takes to communicate their concerns, values, interests, or needs in a fair, clear, unthreatening way, if the listener is not willing to receive that information in that way, the communication will fail."

With couples 

There are many negative effects on romantic relationships caused by pseudo-listening. These effects can range from making romantic partners feel upset, inhibiting the partner's ability to effectively solve problems, encouraging an unhealthy dependence on the listener, raising the partner's level of stress, making the relationship, as a whole, less stable, causing the romantic partner to be less satisfied with the relationship, and even causing negative effects on the romantic partner's health.  It’s important to recognize that there are two parts to any conversation, the person doing the talking and the person who is trying to actively listen.

With parents and children 

Among families, teenagers engage in pseudo-listening the most. Teenagers may engage in pseudo-listening because they feel they have better things to do. They may also tune into distractions and act like they are listening. In doing so, it is evident that they listen only when they want to listen. Studies show that as people get older, pseudo-listening skills increase. An experiment was done on first-grade and second grade children to see if they could repeat what the teacher had been saying. 90% of first graders and 80% of the second-graders could do so; but when the experiment was repeated with teenagers, only 44% of junior high students and 28% of senior high students could repeat their teachers’ remarks. It is important for parents to have good listening skills, because poor listening from parents can cause the child to be closed off.

In a classroom 

Recent studies reveal that students rarely encounter curriculum focused on learning and developing the skill of listening. It is possible for a student to go through every level of education without ever having a class teaching them how to listen effectively in everyday life. Often students fall victim to pseudo-listening because of all the distractions they have at their fingertips, such as phones, computers, social media, iPods, etc. Students will often pretend to be listening so that the professor of the class does not verbally chastise, or to avoid being perceived as rude. Effective listening from a teacher is a way of showing concern for their subordinates, which fosters cohesive bonds, commitment, and trust: this can help a class to pay attention and learn what is being taught.

Leaders

Leadership often involves forming a commitment to the people one is leading, and a large part of this is related to active listening. Pseudo-listening undermines this commitment process and leads to ineffective leadership. Many people think they are listening to others all the time, and while they certainly may be hearing what these people are saying, they are engaging in pseudo-listening. Over time, pseudo-listening can not only weaken perceptions of one as  a leader, but can contribute to problems active listening could otherwise fix and lead to barriers against success in an organization. On the job, we may need to appear interested in what others say because of their position.

Features that contribute 
Things such as an accent, height, weight, scars, and even something as small as body posture can all contribute to an audience falling victim to pseudo-listening. Being self-conscious about some of these personal flaws as a speaker may inhibit the listeners experience. This lack of self-confidence could lead to other distractions made by the speaker. While these physical flaws may lead to disinterest in the reader it could also contribute to nervous actions that may also distract the reader. A few examples of these nervous actions may include but are not limited to clenching your hands, adjusting your hair or clothing, and pacing back and forth while speaking. These actions may lead to a disinterest in the context of a speech and an elevated interest in the person speaking or the environment surrounding them.

Environmental factors such as lighting, temperature, and furniture can affect the attention of the audience in relation to what the speaker has to say. Lighting that is too dark can make an audience tired and consequently disinterested in what the speaker has to say. Temperature and seating arrangements can distract an audience by causing them discomfort, shifting their focus to their own annoyance. Being too far from a speaker can also cause the audience to lose focus because of a sort of "Hawthorne effect". Physiological noise can also lead to distractions that take an audience's attention from the speaker. This noise may range from ailments and illness, all the way to emotions like arousal. Both sides of the spectrum can affect the audience's attention, for example, a speaker giving a speech while under the illness of a cold will have a stuffy nose or a recurring cough, which can take the audience's focus from the speaker to his cold. The audience can also be influenced by their own lives by shifting their focus on what they will eat for lunch, losing or finding a job, personal relationships, etc. These can all overshadow the messages and ideas that the speaker is trying to deliver.

Facial features as distractions 
Because facial hair is a striking characteristic of one's face, people often notice and focus on an individual's facial hair. Because of this, listeners may fall victim to pseudolistening. Instead of making eye contact, listeners might focus on the speaker's mustache or beard instead of actively listening. Facial hair is distracting to both listeners and observers. This concept can also be applied to situations in which a person has something stuck in their teeth, has visible mucus in their nose, or has conspicuous piercings and tattoos on their face.

How to avoid it  
Effective listening is crucial to proper communication in everyday life. However, active listening is not a natural process. In fact, even people who consider themselves good listeners often only listen with 25% efficiency. Active listening involves attentive body language, restating comments and emotions of the speaker, and repeating their ideas back in order to check comprehension accuracy.

It is possible to improve your listening skills. Begin by observing your conversations, and pay special notice to the times you begin to get distracted or ignore the other person and see how it affects your relationships. Once you understand your patterns in conversations, it's easier to change the negative aspects of your conversations. There are three main guidelines everyone should follow if they want to become effective listeners. The most important guideline is being mindful, that is, being disciplined and committed when trying to listen. The next guideline is adapting to listening appropriately because it is beneficial to be skilled in many listening behaviors and to know when each is important. The final guideline to becoming an effective listener is listening actively.  To listen actively, keep eye contact with the speaker, nod when a message is understood, etc. Paraphrasing what was said in order to communicate to the speaker that you understood their message correctly will also improve listening skills. A good tag phrase for paraphrasing is "What I'm hearing you say is...", followed by the question, "Is that right?" This combination of repeating back and asking for confirmation of accuracy frees the speaker to correct any previous ineffective communication.

Signs someone is not listening 
One way to detect pseudolistening is eye fixation: in relaxed conversations, the eye tends to wander or look at other parts of your face. We also tend to smile at one another to reinforce that we agree with them and are listening. The pseudo-listener will do the same but will often smile for too long. During a conversation between two people, their bodies will face each other. A false listener, however, will not have engaged body language; instead, whether their feet face away or they sit next to rather than across from the other person, it is as if their body is trying to escape.

Examples 
 Ambushing: Waiting to trap the speaker in his/her own words or ideas; mostly used to support a belief or to prove something.
 Assimilation to Prior Messages: Believing new messages relate to past messages; forgetting that communication changes.
 Critical Listening: Not to be confused with defensive listening, critical listening is listening to analyze and understand the speaker's messages, written or spoken. 
 Defensive Listening: A form of listening where the remarks by the speaker are taken personally, so the listener seeks a way to defend themselves against the perceived attack.
 Filling in the Gaps: After hearing the beginning, assuming that the information given is the whole story.
 Insensitive Listening: Failing to notice hidden meanings or nonverbal cues.
 Insulated Listening: Avoiding certain topics.
 Selective Listening: Only paying attention to what one is interested in while ignoring and avoiding the rest of the information given.
 Stage-Hogging: Not really caring for what others have to say: only worried about yourself.
 Could also be considered fake or false listening.

False representations

Auditory processing disorder is when a person "is perfectly aware of sounds" yet their brain abnormally deciphers the sounds. This could easily be confused with pseudo-listening because it effects a listeners' reading comprehension. The two differ because auditory processing disorder uncontrollable and unintentional, while pseudolistening is typically done purposely.

References

Communication
Behavioural sciences